Terwilliger Brothers Field at Max Bishop Stadium is a baseball venue in Annapolis, Maryland, United States.  It is home to the Navy Midshipmen baseball team of the NCAA Division I Patriot League.  This field has a capacity of 1,500 spectators.  The stadium is named for Max Bishop, Navy head baseball coach from 1937 to 1961. In his tenure, the team's record was 306–143. The field is named for two Naval Academy alumni, Ron Terwilliger (class of 1963) and Bruce Terwilliger (class of 1964), both contributors to Navy athletics.  The scoreboard at Navy–Marine Corps Memorial Stadium, Navy's football venue, is also named for the brothers.

The field features a full FieldTurf surface (with the exception of the pitcher's mound and the areas around home plate and the bases), which, at the time of construction, was only the third such full surface in college baseball.  The venue also features an LED videoboard, restrooms, concessions, a patio area, and brick archways. In addition to hosting Navy baseball games, Max Bishop Stadium briefly played host to the Bowie Baysox in 1994, as delays in the construction of Prince George's Stadium forced them to play home games for three months at other venues in the region.

See also 
 List of NCAA Division I baseball venues

References 

College baseball venues in the United States
Baseball venues in Maryland
Navy Midshipmen baseball
Navy Midshipmen sports venues
United States Naval Academy buildings and structures
Defunct minor league baseball venues